The remote shell (rsh) is a command-line computer program that can execute shell commands as another user, and on another computer across a computer network.

The remote system to which rsh connects runs the rsh daemon (rshd). The daemon typically uses the well-known Transmission Control Protocol (TCP) port number 514.

History
Rsh originated as part of the BSD Unix operating system, along with rcp, as part of the rlogin package on 4.2BSD in 1983. rsh has since been ported to other operating systems. 

The rsh command has the same name as another common UNIX utility, the restricted shell, which first appeared in PWB/UNIX; in System V Release 4, the restricted shell is often located at /usr/bin/rsh.

Limitations
As described in the rlogin article, the rsh protocol is not secure for network use, because it sends unencrypted information over the network, among other reasons. Some implementations also authenticate by sending unencrypted passwords over the network. rsh has largely been replaced with the secure shell (ssh) program, even on local networks.

Example
As an example of rsh use, the following executes the command mkdir testdir as user remoteuser on the computer host.example.com running a UNIX-like system:

$ rsh -l remoteuser host.example.com "mkdir testdir"

After the command has finished rsh terminates. If no command is specified then rsh will log in on the remote system using rlogin. The network location of the remote computer is looked up using the Domain Name System.

See also
Berkeley r-commands

References
rsh - remote shell - rsh man page.

Internet protocols
OS/2 commands
Unix network-related software